The Republican Left was a Spanish republican party founded in 1934.

History
The party was founded in 1934 following the left's defeat in the 1933 election, by the merger of Manuel Azaña's Republican Action, part of Marcelino Domingo's Radical Socialist Republican Party and Santiago Casares Quiroga's Autonomous Galician Republican Organization (ORGA). Its members included José Giral, Victoria Kent and Manuel Azaña who became the party's leader.

Integrated in the Popular Front ahead of the 1936 election, the party won 87 seats becoming the third largest party while Manuel Azaña obtained the office of President of the Council of Minister. Following the impeachment of Niceto Alcalá Zamora from the presidency in May 1936, Azaña was elected president, an office he held until his resignation in February 1939. He was succeeded as President of the Council first by Santiago Casares Quiroga and then by José Giral. Later, alongside the Republican Union, the party was the main component of the Largo Caballero government in September 1936, at the start of the Spanish Civil War. The IR participated in all republican governments till the end of the civil war.

In exile in Mexico, the IR was the main support of the Republican government-in-exile until it was dissolved in 1959 to found the Spanish Democratic Republican Action. A party taking the name Republican Left was founded in 1977 and has achieved no major electoral success yet.

Notable members
Ramón Bengaray Zabalza
Santiago Casares Quiroga
José Giral
Victoria Kent
Manuel Azaña

See also
Liberalism and radicalism in Spain

References

1934 establishments in Spain
1959 disestablishments in Spain
Anti-fascist organizations
Banned political parties in Spain
Defunct liberal political parties
Defunct political parties in Spain
Liberal parties in Spain
Political parties disestablished in 1959
Political parties established in 1934
Political parties of the Spanish Civil War
Radical parties
Republican parties in Spain